The Sapling Stakes is an American Ungraded Thoroughbred horse race run annually in early September at Monmouth Park in Oceanport, New Jersey. Open to 2-year-olds, it was raced on dirt over a distance of six furlongs for a current purse of $100,000. In 2014, its distance was set at 1 mile or 8 furlongs.

First run in 1883, the New Jersey Legislature passed a law in 1894 that banned parimutuel betting in the state and the track closed. In 1946, the state legislature passed a bill providing for state regulation of horse racing and  the Sapling Stakes was revived.

In 1952, the race was run in two divisions.

This race was downgraded to a Listed Status for its 2014 running.

Records
Time record: 
 1:07.84 – Gilded Time (1992) (former distance of 6 furlongs)

Most wins by an owner:
 3 – James Cox Brady Jr. (1949, 1952, 1953)

Most wins by a jockey:
 3 – Braulio Baeza (1964, 1965, 1968)
 3 – Craig Perret (1980, 1982, 1996)
 3 – Joe Bravo (1997, 2000, 2006)
 3 – Paco Lopez (2012, 2014, 2016)

Most wins by a trainer:
 8 – D. Wayne Lukas (1987, 1989, 1990, 1991, 1994, 1995, 1997, 1998)

Winners of the Sapling stakes

Earlier winners

 1883 – Duchess (W. Donohue) 1:18.75 
 1884 – Brookwood (Edward Feakes) 1:15.50
 1885 – Savanac (R. Olney) 1:17 .00
 1886 – Hanover (Jim McLaughlin) 1:17.50 
 1887 – Fitz James (Edward H. Garrison) 1:16.50 
 1888 – Tipstaff  (Eilke)  1:15.25
 1889 – Devotee (W. Hayward) 1:15.25 
 1890 – Sorcerer  (F. Reagan) 1:16.25
 1891 – Air Plant (Anthony Hamilton) 1:12.75 
 1892 – Don Alonzo (Fred Taral) 1:13.75 
 1893 – Senator Grady (W. Midgley) 1:05.00

Note: the 1893 race was run at  furlongs on the straight course.

References

External links
 The Sapling Stakes at Pedigree Query

1883 establishments in New Jersey
Horse races in New Jersey
Monmouth Park Racetrack
Flat horse races for two-year-olds
Ungraded stakes races in the United States
Recurring sporting events established in 1883